The 2023 European Athletics Team Championships (ETC) in athletics will be held at Stadion Śląski in June 2023.

The event was first planned to be held in Madrid, but after European Athletics and European Olympic Committee reached to an agreement, the event was added to the 2023 European Games programme and moved to Poland. Madrid will host the 2025 ETC.

Format change
The competition will consist of three divisions, instead of four leagues, based on the results of the 2021 Championships. 1st Division will compete in the evening sessions of 23–25 June, while 3rd Division in the morning sessions and the 2nd Division in the evening sessions of 20–22 June.

1st Division

Participating countries

2nd Division

Participating countries

3rd Division

Participating countries

  AASSE*
 
 
 
 
  
  
 
 
 
 
 
  
 
 

(*) The Athletic Association of Small States of Europe (AASSE) team comprises athletes from Gibraltar, Liechtenstein and Monaco.

References

External links
Official EAA Site

European Athletics Team Championships
Team
European
International athletics competitions hosted by Spain
Athletics European Team Championships
European Athletics Team Championships
European Athletics Team Championships